Sarasola is a surname of Basque origin. Notable people with this surname include:

Elixabete Sarasola (born 1991), Spanish footballer
Enrique Sarasola (1937–2002), Spanish industrialist
Iñigo Sarasola (born 1987), Spanish footballer
Simón Sarasola (1871–1947), Spanish meteorologist and Jesuit priest

Basque-language surnames